ON Technology Corporation was a software company in the United States. It was formed in 1987  by Mitch Kapor after his departure from Lotus Software.  The original plan of the business was to build an object-oriented PC desktop environment providing a variety of applications.  In (roughly) the early 1990s, the company was acquired by Notework Corporation, a vendor of LAN email systems. The management of the merged company was the Notework Corporation management, but the company retained the ON Technology name (which management perceived had more cache/brand.)

Subsequently, ON Technology performed a series of small product/company acquisitions to grow its product line, including additional email software (DaVinci, a message handling system-based email product), anti-virus technology, (corporate) Internet usage monitoring, IP firewall, and desktop systems management.

The company went public in (approximately) 1995, providing an additional structural method to perform most of the acquisitions providing the products listed above.

The company was unique in its go-to-market model, using a 30-day free trial model coupled with significant marketing and telesales to reach a large number of small- to medium-sized customers.

In 1998, the company restructured its operations and sold off its "free-trial" small/medium business products to Elron Software. It retained "enterprise-sized" products (the MeetingMaker calendaring product and the ON Command CCM desktop systems management product) which it sold using a more traditional enterprise software business model.

ON spun out the Meeting Maker product in a private transaction to a private investor, who eventually sold the technology to PeopleCube. The only remaining technology at this point was the systems management software, branded "CCM" at that time.

ON was acquired by Symantec on October 27, 2003. to assist Symantec's move into the desktop systems management business.

References

Defunct software companies of the United States
Gen Digital acquisitions

de:ON Technology Corp.